Steve Jurgensen (born October 27, 1961) is an American professional golfer.

Jurgensen was born in San Jose, California. He played college golf one year at the University of Houston. He turned professional in 1985.

Jurgensen played on the Nationwide Tour from 1993 to 1995 and in 1997. He won the 1993 Nike Tri-Cities Open. He played on the PGA Tour in 1996, 1998, and 1999. His best finish was T-4 at the 1997 Deposit Guaranty Golf Classic.

Professional wins (5)

Nike Tour wins (1)

Nike Tour playoff record (0–1)

Other wins (4)
1986 New Hampshire Open
1987 Massachusetts Open
1991 Long Beach Open
2022 Southern Texas PGA Championship

See also
1995 PGA Tour Qualifying School graduates
1997 PGA Tour Qualifying School graduates
1998 PGA Tour Qualifying School graduates

References

External links

American male golfers
Houston Cougars men's golfers
PGA Tour golfers
Golfers from California
Sportspeople from San Jose, California
1961 births
Living people